The Martinique national football team represents the French overseas department and region of Martinique in international football. The team is controlled by the Ligue de Football de la Martinique, a local branch of French Football Federation. On 7 August 2010, the team adopted the nickname Les Matinino, which pays tribute to the history of the island.

Overview
As an overseas department of the French Republic, Martinique is not a member of FIFA and is therefore not eligible to enter the FIFA World Cup or any competition organised first-hand by the organisation. Martiniquais, being French citizens, are eligible to play for the France national football team. Martinique is, however, a member of CONCACAF and CFU and is eligible for all competitions organised by either organisation. Indeed, according to the status of the FFF (article 34, paragraph 6): "[...]Under the control of related continental confederations, and with the agreement of the FFF, those leagues can organize international sport events at a regional level or set up teams in order to participate to them."'

Martinique's highest honour to date was winning the Caribbean Cup in 1993. Martinique also was a two-time winner of the CFU Championship, a precursor to the Caribbean Cup. A more recent success was winning the 2010 Coupe de l'Outre-Mer. The team defeated Réunion 5–3 on penalties to claim the title. The Martinique team has participated in three CONCACAF Gold Cups and its best finish in the competition was in 2002 when the team reached the quarterfinals where they lost to Canada 6–5 on penalties.

 Results and fixtures 
The tables below include matches from the past 12 months as well as any future scheduled matches.

Key

2022

2023

Players

Current squad

The following players were called up for the 2022–23 CONCACAF Nations match against Costa Rica in March 2023.Caps and goals as of 25 February 2023, after the second match against French Guyana. 

Recent call-ups
The following players have also been called up to the Martinique squad in the past 12 months.

Player recordsPlayers in bold are still active with Martinique.Most appearances

Top goalscorers

 Competitive record 

 CONCACAF Gold Cup 

Martinique has participated in six of the fifteen CONCACAF Gold Cups contested. The team's first appearance in the competition was in 1993. The team was eliminated in the first round, however, not without procuring its first point in the competition after earning a 2–2 draw against Canada. Martinique's next appearance in the competition came in 2002. The team achieved its best performance reaching the quarterfinals where they lost to Canada 6–5 on penalties. The following year, Martinique appeared in the competition again, however, the team departed the tournament without scoring a goal.*Draws include knockout matches decided by penalty shootout.**Gold background colour indicates that the tournament was won. Red border colour indicates tournament was held on home soil. CONCACAF Nations League 

 CFU Caribbean Cup 
From 1978–1985, Martinique participated in the CFU Championship, a precursor to the Caribbean Cup. Of the six championships played, Martinique featured three final rounds. Les Matinino'' won the competition twice in 1983 and 1985. Martinique appeared in fourteen Caribbean Cups. The Martinique team was the organization with the smallest population to have won the competition. Martinique won their first and only Caribbean Cup title in 1993. The tournament was played in Jamaica and Martinique defeated the hosts 6–5 on penalties in the final match. The following year, Martinique finished runner-up to Trinidad and Tobago. The team finished in third place on three occasions in 1992, 1996, and 2001.

Coupe de l'Outre-Mer 
Martinique has participated all three editions of the Coupe de l'Outre-Mer, which was established in 2008. In the first edition, the team finished runner-up to the champions Réunion losing 1–0 in the final. In 2010, Martinique won its first Coupe de l'Outre-Mer defeating the defending champions Réunion 5–3 on penalties at the Stade Dominique Duvauchelle in Créteil. They re-lost the title to Reunion in 2012 in a penalty shootout.

Honours
 CFU Championship & Caribbean Cup:
 Winners (3): 1983, 1985, 1993
 Coupe de l'Outre-Mer:
 Winners (1): 2010

References

External links

National Football Teams page

 
Caribbean national association football teams
CONCACAF teams not affiliated to FIFA
National football teams of Overseas France